Easy Street is a 1917 short action-comedy film starring and directed by Charlie Chaplin.

Plot
In a slum area called Easy Street, the police are failing to maintain law and order.

The Little Tramp, a down-and-out derelict, is sleeping rough outside the Hope Mission near the streets of a lawless slum. The sounds of a service in progress draws him wearily inside. After the sermon from the preacher, he is entranced by a beautiful mission worker and organist and he stays after the service. Holding his hand, she pleads him to join the mission, inspiring his religious "awakening". He vows to reform, returning the collection box that he slipped into capacious pants.

Spotting a help-wanted ad for a job at the police station, the Tramp accepts and is assigned the rough-and-tumble Easy Street as his beat. Upon entering the street he finds a bully roughing up the locals and pilfering their money. The Tramp gets on the wrong side of the bully and after a brief chase, the Tramp finds him impervious to his blows. In a display of his great strength, the bully bends a gas streetlamp in two, whereupon Charlie leaps on his back, covers his head with the lamp, and turns on the gas, rendering him unconscious.

After giving him one more shot of gas, he calls the squad to retrieve the Bully. For the
moment, the Tramp becomes the cock-of-the-walk in the locality, frightening away the denizens by simply spinning around to face them. Then he helps a woman (who turns out to be the Bully's wife) who has stolen food from a street vendor but she rather 'rewards' him by nearly dropping a flower pot on his head. The mission worker happens by and takes him across the way to another apartment where a couple has a large brood of children whom Charlie feeds by scattering bread crumbs among them as if he were feeding chickens.

The bully is put in handcuffs by the police but manages to escape from the station and returns to Easy Street. After a battle with his wife, he attacks the Tramp. He chases the Tramp fanatically until he manages to knock the bully unconscious by dropping a heavy stove on his head from a two-story window. On returning to his beat on Easy Street, the unruly mob knocks the Tramp unconscious and drops him into a nearby cellar where he manages to save the Mission worker from a nasty junkie after accidentally sitting on the drug addict's upturned needle. Supercharged by the effects of the drug, he takes on the mob and heroically defeats them all, and as a consequence restores peace and order to Easy Street.

By the end of the film, a New Mission is built on Easy Street and the inhabitants flock to it, even including the former bully: now a well-dressed respectable, churchgoing citizen. Arm in arm, The Derelict and The Mission Worker follow them into the church.

Charlie On The Beat
An edited version of this film was released as "Charlie On The Beat". It was available in 8mm silent cine format. It ran for about 3.5 minutes and is available on YouTube [Link to film www.youtube.com/watch?v=0iBftP-QkOM&t=7s].

Inspiration

It could have been inspired by the similarly named East Street market in the Walworth district of London (where Chaplin is believed to have been born), a suggestion made as early as 1928 in the film The Life Story of Charlie Chaplin by Harry B. Parkinson and reasserted in David Robinson's introduction to the most recent edition of My Autobiography, while the famous trousers and boots of Chaplin's trademark tramp costume may have been drawn from the everyday clothes Chaplin saw worn there.

Review
A reviewer from Variety wrote, "The resultant chaos and several new stunts will be bound to bring the laughter, and the star's display of agility and acrobatics approaches some of the Douglas Fairbanks pranks. Chaplin has always been throwing things in his films, but when he 'eases' a cook stove out of the window onto the head of his adversary on the street below, that pleasant little bouquet adds a new act to his repertoire. Easy Street certainly has some rough work in it--maybe a bit rougher than the others--but it is the kind of stuff that Chaplin fans love. In fact, few who see Easy Street will fail to be furnished with hearty laughter."

Cast
Charlie Chaplin ... The Derelict
Edna Purviance ... The Mission Worker
Eric Campbell ... The Bully
Albert Austin ... Minister/Policeman
Lloyd Bacon ... Drug Addict
Henry Bergman ... Anarchist
Frank J. Coleman ... Policeman
William Gillespie ... Heroin addict
James T. Kelley ... Mission Visitor/Policeman
Charlotte Mineau ... Big Eric's Wife
John Rand ... Mission Tramp/Policeman
Janet Miller Sully ... Mother in Mission
Loyal Underwood ... Small Father/Policeman
Erich von Stroheim Jr. ... Baby
Leo White ... Policeman (uncredited)
Tom Wood ... Chief of Police (uncredited)

Sound version
In 1932, Amedee Van Beuren of Van Beuren Studios, purchased Chaplin's Mutual comedies for $10,000 each, added music by Gene Rodemich and Winston Sharples and sound effects, and re-released them through RKO Radio Pictures. Chaplin had no legal recourse to stop the RKO release.

See also
Charlie Chaplin filmography

References

External links

 Article at InDigest Magazine about the film recently being scored by Justin Vernon (Bon Iver)

1917 films
Short films directed by Charlie Chaplin
1910s action comedy films
American black-and-white films
American silent short films
1910s police comedy films
American action comedy films
Articles containing video clips
1917 short films
American comedy short films
Mutual Film films
1917 comedy films
1910s American films
Silent American comedy films